is a former Japanese football player. He played for Japan national team.

Club career
Ashikaga was born in Akita Prefecture on May 22, 1950. After graduating from high school, he joined Mitsubishi Motors in 1969. The club won the league champions in 1969, 1973 and 1978. The club also won 1971, 1973, 1978 Emperor's Cup and 1978 JSL Cup. He retired in 1978. He played 132 games and scored 36 goals in the league.

National team career
In September 1971, Ashikaga was selected Japan national team for 1972 Summer Olympics qualification. At this qualification, on September 23, he debuted against Malaysia. He also played at 1974 World Cup qualification. He played 7 games for Japan until 1975.

Club statistics

National team statistics

References

External links
 
 Japan National Football Team Database

1950 births
Living people
Association football people from Akita Prefecture
Japanese footballers
Japan international footballers
Japan Soccer League players
Urawa Red Diamonds players
Association football midfielders